The High Sheriff of East Sussex is a current title which has existed since 1974; the holder is changed annually every March. For around 1,000 years the county of Sussex was covered by a single High Sheriff of Sussex but after the Local Government Act 1972 the title was split to cover the newly created counties of East Sussex and West Sussex.

The position was once a powerful position responsible for collecting taxes and enforcing law and order in the county. In modern times the high sheriff has become a ceremonial role, presiding over public ceremonies.

History 
The office of High Sheriff is over 1000 years old, with its establishment before the Norman Conquest. The Office of High Sheriff remained first in precedence in the counties until the reign of Edward VII when an Order in Council in 1908 gave the Lord-Lieutenant the prime office under the Crown as the Sovereign's personal representative. The High Sheriff remains the Sovereign's representative in the County for all matters relating to the Judiciary and the maintenance of law and order..

Roles and responsibilities 
High Sheriffs are responsible in the Counties of England and Wales for duties conferred by the Crown through Warrant from the Privy Council, including:
Attendance at Royal visits to the County
The wellbeing and protection of Her Majesty's High Court Judges when on Circuit in the County and attending them in Court during the legal terms
The execution of High Court Writs and Orders (which is mainly achieved through the Under Sheriff)
Acting as the Returning Officer for Parliamentary Elections in County constituencies
Responsibility for the proclamation of the accession of a new Sovereign
The maintenance of the loyalty of subjects to the Crown

High Sheriffs of East Sussex

References
 High sheriffs of East Sussex
Notice category:
State
Notice type:
Privy Council Office
Publication date:
17 March 2022
Edition:
The London Gazette
Notice ID:
4012320
Notice code:
1106

Politics of East Sussex
East Sussex
 East Sussex
High Sheriffs